Hugh Ashton Page (born 3 July 1962) is a former South African first class cricketer who was born in Rhodesia. He played his cricket with Transvaal and spent the 1987 English season with Essex.

References

1962 births
Living people
South African cricketers
Gauteng cricketers
Essex cricketers
Griqualand West cricketers
Staffordshire cricketers